Joona Rahikka (born 29 January 1999) is a Finnish professional footballer who plays for FC Honka, as a defender.

References

1999 births
Living people
Finnish footballers
Käpylän Pallo players
FC Honka players
Pallohonka players
Kakkonen players
Veikkausliiga players
Association football defenders